The Sanremo Open is a defunct men's tennis tournament that was part of the World Series of the ATP Tour for one year in July/August 1990. The event was held in Sanremo, northern Italy, and was played on outdoor clay courts.

Finals

Singles

Doubles

References

External links
 San Remo Open

ATP Tour
Defunct tennis tournaments in Italy
Clay court tennis tournaments